Attilio Benfatto (11 March 1943, in  – 5 April 2017, in Mirano) was an Italian professional road cyclist. He most notably won two stages of the Giro d'Italia. Throughout his career, he competed in eight editions of the Giro d'Italia and two editions of the Tour de France. His best placing was 25th overall in the 1969 Giro d'Italia.

Major results
1966
 1st Stage 3 Peace Race
 1st Stage 4 Tour de l'Avenir
 3rd  Team time trial, UCI Road World Championships
1968
 5th Coppa Sabatini
1969
 1st Stage 23 Giro d'Italia
1971
 10th Liège–Bastogne–Liège
1972
 1st Stage 8 Giro d'Italia
1973
 10th Overall Giro di Puglia

References

External links

1943 births
2017 deaths
Italian male cyclists
Cyclists from the Metropolitan City of Venice
People from Mirano